Numancia (F83) is the third of the six Spanish-built s, based on the American  design, of the Spanish Navy.

Laid down on 8 January 1986, and launched on 29 January 1987, Numancia was commissioned in service on 17 November 1989.

All of these Spanish frigates have the length of the later Oliver Hazard Perry frigates, and have a wider beam than the US Navy design, and are therefore able to carry more top weight. Fin stabilizers are fitted.

On 27 April 2009 Numancia seized the 9 somali pirates that tried to board MSC Melody.

Other units of class

References 

Ships of the Spanish Navy
1987 ships
Santa María-class frigates